Magnolia campbellii, or Campbell's magnolia, is a species of Magnolia that grows in sheltered valleys in the Himalaya from eastern Nepal, Sikkim and Assam, India, east to southwestern China (southern Xizang, Yunnan, southern Sichuan) and south to northern Myanmar.

Description

Magnolia campbellii is a medium-sized to large deciduous tree growing to 30 m, rarely to 45 m, tall, with smooth grey bark. The leaves are 10–23 cm (rarely to 33 cm) long and 4.5–10 cm (rarely to 14 cm) broad, fuzzy underneath and with an acute apex. The flowers are very large, 15–25 cm (rarely 35 cm) diameter, with 12-16 tepals, which vary from white to dark pink. They appear very early, before the leaves, opening from late winter to early spring. After opening, the innermost tepals remain erect while the others spread widely. This arrangement may shelter the stamens and stigmas from rain, snow, and other harsh environmental conditions common during their very early flowering time period.

Hooker named the species after Archibald Campbell, Superintendent of Darjeeling.

Varieties
There are two varieties: 
Magnolia campbellii var. campbellii. Western part of the species' range, in the Himalaya. Shoots and flower stalks thinly hairy.
Magnolia campbellii var. mollicomata. Eastern part of the species' range, in Yunnan and surrounding areas. Shoots more densely hairy, flower stalks thickly felted.

Cultivation
Magnolia campbellii is grown as an ornamental tree for its breathtaking flowers, though successful flowering is limited to mild areas with no late spring frosts. Magnolia campbellii var. mollicomata flowers slightly later and is less likely to have its flowers frost-damaged.

Young trees take a long time to reach flowering age and need deep, moist soil and a mild, sheltered site.

Cultivars
Several cultivars have been named, including 'Alba' (white flowers), 'Charles Raffil' (bright purple-pink flowers; starts flowering on younger trees), and 'Strybing White' (white flowers).

A number of hybrids with other Magnolias have also been developed.

References

Hunt, D. (ed). (1998). Magnolias and their allies. International Dendrology Society and Magnolia Society. 
Flora of China: Magnoliaceae (draft account)

Further reading
 Nelson, E. C. "Magnolia campbellii in County Cork." The Garden 104 (1979): 495-196.

External links
Magnoliasociety.org: Photo of Magnolia campbellii var. mollicomata flowers

campbellii
Trees of China
Trees of Nepal
Flora of Assam (region)
Flora of East Himalaya
Flora of Indo-China
Garden plants of Asia
Ornamental trees